Bokaro Ispat Vidyalaya, Sector IX/D, or BIV 9D, was established in May 1991 as an English medium co-educational school affiliated to the Central Board of Secondary Education, New Delhi, India. Bokaro Ispat Vidalaya, Sector IX/D is run by Steel Authority of India Limited, a public service undertaking, and India's largest steel manufacturing, a Maharatna company.

School Campus
The School campus is located in sector IX/D, at the back of Jawaharlal Nehru Biological Park. It offers education until 10th standard.

External links
 School webpage

Schools in Jharkhand
1991 establishments in Bihar
Educational institutions established in 1991